Arthur Herbert Copeland (June 22, 1898 Rochester, New York – July 6, 1970) was an American mathematician. He graduated from Harvard University in 1926 and taught at Rice University and the University of Michigan. His main interest was in the foundations of probability.

He worked with Paul Erdős on the Copeland-Erdős constant. His son, Arthur Herbert Copeland, Jr. (1926-2019), was also a mathematician.

Copeland published a paper about pairwise voting, which was very similar to the work of Ramon Llull and Marquis de Condorcet.   The system he described became known as "Copeland's method".

Selected works
 
 
 
 
 
 
 with Paul Erdős: 
 with Frank Harary:

References

20th-century American mathematicians
Harvard University alumni
Probability theorists
1898 births
1970 deaths
Rice University faculty
University of Michigan faculty
Voting theorists